Max Marsille (7 January 1931 – 2 August 2019) was a Belgian boxer. He competed in the men's heavyweight event at the 1952 Summer Olympics.

References

1931 births
2019 deaths
Belgian male boxers
Olympic boxers of Belgium
Boxers at the 1952 Summer Olympics
Sportspeople from Brussels
Heavyweight boxers